Nasehabad (also Romanized as Nāşeḩābād) is a village in Ferdows Rural District, Ferdows District, Rafsanjan County, Kerman Province, Iran. At the 2006 census, its population was 302, in 75 families.

References 

Populated places in Rafsanjan County